It's a Small World is a 1950 American film directed by William Castle. The film was released on DVD in 2010.

Plot

Cast
Paul Dale as Harry Musk
Lorraine Miller as Buttons
Will Geer as William Musk – Father
Nina Koshetz as Rose Ferris
Steve Brodie as Charlie
Anne Sholter as Dolly Burke
Todd Karns as Sam
Margaret Field as Janie at Age 16
Shirley Mills as Susan Musk at Age 16 (as Shirley O. Mills)
Thomas Browne Henry as Jackson (as Tom Brown Henry)
Harry Harvey as Town Doctor
Paul E. Burns as Italian Truck Farmer
Jacqui Snyder as Susan Musk at Age 8
Lora Lee Michel as Janie at Age 8

References

External links
 
 

1950 films
1950 comedy-drama films
American comedy-drama films
Films directed by William Castle
American black-and-white films
Films scored by Karl Hajos
1950s English-language films
1950s American films